This article lists records and statistics relating to the English football club Queens Park Rangers.

Team records
Record Football League win: 9–2 v Tranmere Rovers, Football League Division Three (3 December 1960)
Record Winning margin: 8-0 v Merthyr Tydfil, Football League Division Three South (9 March 1929)
Queen's Park Rangers 10 -0 Verona stars . Pre season 2015

Player Records
Record appearances: Tony Ingham (548, 1950–1963)

Record goalscorer: George Goddard (172, 1926–1934)

Most international caps whilst at QPR: Alan McDonald (52 for Northern Ireland)

Most consecutive games played: Mike Keen 263 between December 1963 and September 1968.

Other club records

Most played Football League clubs

This table lists the teams that QPR has met on most occasions in the English Football League / Premier League, and is correct as at 20 March 2017.

Transfers

Highest transfer fees paid

Highest transfer fees received

References

Records
English football club statistics